Tolkien fandom is an international, informal community of fans of the works of J. R. R. Tolkien, especially of the Middle-earth legendarium which includes The Hobbit, The Lord of the Rings, and The Silmarillion. The concept of Tolkien fandom as a specific type of fan subculture sprang up in the United States in the 1960s, in the context of the hippie movement, to the dismay of the author (Tolkien died in 1973), who talked of  "my deplorable cultus".

A Tolkienist is someone who studies the work of J. R. R. Tolkien: this usually involves the study of the Elvish languages and "Tolkienology". A Ringer is a fan of The Lord of the Rings in general, and of Peter Jackson's live-action film trilogy in particular. Other terms for Tolkien fans include Tolkienite  or Tolkiendil.

History

Tolkien's The Hobbit, a children's book, was first published in 1937, and it proved popular. But The Lord of the Rings, first published in three volumes in 1954 and 1955, gave rise to fandom as a cultural phenomenon from the 1960s onwards.

Early fandom (1950s to 1973)

1950s 

Tolkien fandom began within science fiction fandom soon after The Fellowship of the Ring was published in 1954. Tolkien was discussed in science fiction fanzines and amateur press association magazines ("apazines"), both as single essays like "No Monroe In Lothlorien!" in Eric Bentcliffe's Triode, and in extended threads of comment such as by Robert Lichtman in his Psi Phi. Tolkien-inspired costumes were worn at Worldcons from 1958. An organized Tolkien fandom organization called "The Fellowship of the Ring" came together in Pittcon, the 18th World Science Fiction Convention in Pittsburgh on 4 September 1960.  England's first Tolkien fanzine was Nazgul's Bane, produced by Cheslin. Many fanzines had little Tolkien content but Tolkien-inspired names such as Ancalagon, Glamdring, Lefnui, Mathom, Perian, Ringwraith, Shadowfax, and so on. Others had more meaningful Tolkien content. Ed Meskys' apazine Niekas turned into a full-fledged fanzine during this era. Pete Mansfield's Sword & Sorcery fanzine, Eldritch Dream Quest, included many Tolkien items.

1960s America 

Foster (2006) attributes the surge of Tolkien fandom in the United States of the mid-1960s to a combination of the hippie subculture and anti-war movement pursuing "mellow freedom like that of the Shire" and "America's cultural Anglophilia" of the time, fuelled by a bootleg paperback version of The Lord of the Rings published by Ace Books followed up by an authorised edition by Ballantine Books.

The "hippie" following latched onto the book, giving its own spin to the work's interpretation, such as the Dark Lord Sauron representing the United States military draft during the Vietnam War, to the chagrin of the author who talked of a "deplorable cultus" and stated that "Many young Americans are involved in the stories in a way that I'm not" but who nevertheless admitted that "... even the nose of a very modest idol [...] cannot remain entirely untickled by the sweet smell of incense!" Fan attention became so intense that Tolkien had to take his phone number out of the public directory and eventually moved to Bournemouth on the south coast of England.

This embracing of the work by American 1960s counter-culture made it an easy target for mockery, as in Harvard Lampoon's parody Bored of the Rings, where Tom Bombadil becomes "Tim Benzedrine", and Bilbo Baggins becomes "Dildo Bugger". The Lord of the Rings gained a reputation as a dubious work of popular culture rather than "real literature", and postponing the emergence of academic Tolkien studies by some twenty years, to the late 1980s.

The Lord of the Rings acquired immense popularity in the emerging hacker culture from the mid-1960s, and the technological subcultures of scientists, engineers, and computer programmers, and flourishes there still. It figured as one of the major inspirations of the nascent video game industry and the evolution of fantasy role-playing games.

Many fantasy series written in the period were created by fans of The Lord of the Rings, such as the Shannara books by Terry Brooks.

Tolkien societies

Although there were active Tolkien enthusiasts within science fiction fandom from the mid-1950s, true organized Tolkien fandom only took off with the publication of the second hardcover edition and the paperbacks in the 1960s. Although there are numerous Tolkien societies in different countries today, they are not endorsed or even authorized by the Tolkien Estate.

The first recorded organized Tolkien fan group was "The Fellowship of the Ring", founded by Ted Johnstone. Their first annual meeting was held at Pittcon, the 1960 Worldcon. They published four issues of the fanzine i-Palantír before the organization disbanded; the first was published a month before the Pittcon meeting, dated August 1960. Articles on The Lord of the Rings appeared regularly in the 1960s science fiction fanzine Niekas, edited by Ed Meskys.

The Tolkien Society of America first met "in February, 1965, beside the statue of Alma Mater on the Columbia University campus," according to a 1967 New York Times interview with Richard Plotz, the Society's founder and first Thain. By 1967, Meskys had become Thain and the society boasted over 1,000 members, organized into local groups or smials, a pattern that would be followed by other Tolkien fan organizations. The society published a newsletter, Green Dragon, and The Tolkien Journal (edited by Plotz). In 1969, the society sponsored the first Tolkien Conference at Belknap College. The Tolkien Conference was not a science fiction convention but a scholarly event. The University of Wisconsin Tolkien and Fantasy Society was founded in 1966, and is best known for its journal Orcrist (1966–1977), edited by Richard C. West. Across the continent, Glen GoodKnight founded the Mythopoeic Society in California in 1967 for the study, discussion, and enjoyment of fantastic and mythic literature, especially the works of Tolkien and fellow-Inklings C. S. Lewis, and Charles Williams. The society held its first Mythcon conference in 1970, which featured readings, a costume competition, an art show, and other events typical of science fiction conventions of the day. The society's three current periodicals are Mythprint, a monthly bulletin; Mythlore, originally a fanzine and now a peer-reviewed journal that publishes scholarly articles on mythic and fantastic literature; and The Mythic Circle, a literary annual of original poetry and short stories (which replaced the Society's earlier publications Mythril and Mythellany). Alongside that was a monthly newsletter, Mythprint. Beyond Bree is the monthly newsletter of The American Mensa Tolkien Special Interest Group.

Orcrist and The Tolkien Journal published three joint issues (1969–1971). The Tolkien Journal and Mythlore published several joint issues in the later 1970s and eventually merged.

The Tolkien Society (UK) was founded in the United Kingdom in 1969, and remains active as a registered charity. The society has two regular publications, a bi-monthly bulletin of news and information, Amon Hen, and an annual journal, Mallorn, featuring critical articles and essays on Tolkien's work. They host several annual events, including a conference held at Oxford, Oxonmoot.

Both the UK Tolkien Society and the Mythopoeic Society are organized into "Special Interest Groups", focusing on one area such as languages, and into local or regional groups which meet on a regular basis. The journal Parma Eldalamberon, founded in 1971, is a publication of one such special interest group of the Mythopoeic Society.

There is a long tradition of organized Tolkien fandoms in Scandinavia. The Tolkien Society of Sweden was founded in Gothenburg in 1968 ("of Sweden" was added in 1969 to avoid confusion with the UK society) and The Tolkien Society Forodrim was founded in Sweden in 1972. Denmark has two Tolkien societies, Bri, the Danish Tolkien Society and Imladris, which is a virtual community only.

Some fans, known as Tolkien tourists, travel for the purpose of visiting Lord of the Rings and Tolkien-related sites.

1970s to 1980s

Isaac Asimov, who had read The Lord of the Rings three times by Tolkien's death in September 1973, wrote a Black Widowers short story as tribute to the fellow author. "Nothing Like Murder" (1974) mentions college students forming Tolkien societies at Columbia and elsewhere. Tolkien's son Christopher began the publication of posthumous material, beginning with the Silmarillion (1977) which was being prepared for publication by Tolkien but left unfinished at his death, followed by The History of Middle-earth series (1983 to 1996). J. R. R. Tolkien: A Biography (1977) and The Letters of J. R. R. Tolkien (1981) provided biographical information. These publications provided the raw material for in-depth Tolkien research, pioneered by Tom Shippey's The Road to Middle-earth (1982).

Interest in The Lord of the Rings led to several attempts to adapt it for the film medium, most of which were largely unsuccessful. Filmmaker Ralph Bakshi succeeded in securing the rights to produce an animated feature film version, part one of what was originally planned as a two-part adaptation of the story. Bakshi produced the film using, among other animation techniques, rotoscoping, shooting a majority of the film in live-action first before transferring the live footage to animation. While the film had, and continues to have, a mixed critical reaction, it was a financial success, costing USD 8 million to produce, and grossing over USD 30 million at the box office. Despite this fact, United Artists, the film's original distributor, refused to fund a sequel, leaving the project incomplete.

1990s to 2000s

The 1990s saw the conclusion of The History of Middle-earth series. A series of minor texts by Tolkien were edited in journals such as  Parma Eldalamberon and Vinyar Tengwar, published by the Elvish Linguistic Fellowship since the early 1990s. In the 2000s, several encyclopedic projects have documented Tolkien's life and work in great detail, such as the J.R.R. Tolkien Encyclopedia (2006) and the twin volumes The Lord of the Rings: A Reader's Companion and The J. R. R. Tolkien Companion and Guide (2005, 2006). The dedicated journal Tolkien Studies has been appearing from 2004.

A "Tolkien Reading Day", held annually on 25 March, an anniversary of the fall of Barad-dûr, was proposed by Sean Kirst, a columnist at The Post-Standard in Syracuse, New York, and launched by the Tolkien Society in 2003.

Peter Jackson movies

The Lord of the Rings gained a much broader audience with the release of Peter Jackson's The Lord of the Rings film trilogy. These were released serially in three consecutive years, from December 2001 to December 2003. Since then, a large number of fans have arisen who have not read any of the books, and have been only exposed to Tolkien through the films and its merchandise.

Tolkien-related games, especially computer and video games have increased in number and in popularity. Popular culture references to Middle-earth have increased, as well as satires and parodies of it.

Online

Tolkien discussion took place in many newsgroups from the earliest days of Usenet. The Tolklang mailing list was started in 1990. The alt.fan.tolkien and rec.arts.books.tolkien newsgroups have been active since 1992 and 1993, respectively.

Notable points of contention in online discussions surround the origin of orcs, whether elves have pointy ears, whether balrogs have wings, and the nature of Tom Bombadil. Following the announcement of Jackson's movies (from 2001), online fandom became divided between "Revisionists" and "Purists" over controversy surrounding changes to the novel made for the movies, such as those made to the character of Arwen and the absence of Tom Bombadil.

TheOneRing.net (or TORn)
 

One of the most prominent fansites of Jackson's movies is TheOneRing.net, which was popular even with the cast and crew of the film. TORn, as it is called, was originally a small movie-news site that gained in prestige as movie-rumors became reality. The filmmakers put special effort into winning over the fans, not simply tolerating but actually actively supporting fansites for Ringers. The site was founded in 1999 by a group of Tolkien fans eager for the upcoming The Lord of the Rings film trilogy who were gathering information about the film. In 1998, Michael 'Xoanon' Regina and Erica 'Tehanu' Challis started a website using all of the information they could get related to the filming of The Lord of the Rings, including exclusive "spy" reports from Tehanu's visit to the New Zealand set. This activity first got her escorted off the set, and then invited back on to take an official look around and meet director Peter Jackson. In early 1999, a designer by the username of Calisuri came across the site and asked if they needed some design and technical help to grow the site and make it a central web location for other Tolkien fans. Calisuri's friend Corvar, who he was acquainted with from the Nightmare LPMud, was brought aboard to provide server and business help. Xoanon, Tehanu, Calisuri and Corvar then formed The One Ring, Inc. and are the sole owners/founders of TheOneRing.net.

The site is unique in that there was a mutual working relationship between the crew of TheOneRing.net and that of The Lord of the Rings films, and later The Hobbit films. This relationship enabled the site to bring its readers exclusive news from the set, as when Peter Jackson emailed TheOneRing.net in an effort to get his side heard when a lawsuit threatened his chance to film The Hobbit.

Events

Like other fan sites, members gather in small groups called moots, form personal friendships (even marriages), hold extended online discussions with archives, and so on. In 2003 Cold Spring Press released TORn's book The People's Guide to J.R.R. Tolkien. Written by five major contributors to TheOneRing.net, it includes essays ranging from a spirited defense of fantasy as a genre, discussions of Tolkien's views of good and evil, an examination of cultural norms, and more. The foreword by the Tolkien scholar Tom Shippey, author of The Road to Middle-earth and J. R. R. Tolkien: Author of the Century, says: "The Internet, the experience of continually answering questions and receiving comments ... give the organizers of TheOneRing.net a perspective which is uniquely broad, and uniquely full of surprises, some of which would have pleased Tolkien very much, but which he could not have expected." This was followed by More People's Guide to J.R.R. Tolkien in 2004. Over 1,500 "Ringers" (Lord of the Rings fans) from around the world came to the TheOneRing.net Oscar party at the Hollywood, CA, American Legion on 28 February 2004. The event was attended by Peter Jackson, Fran Walsh, Elijah Wood and many more of the cast and crew of The Lord of the Rings, several of whom skipped the official New Line party that evening. On 2 September 2004, eleven commemorative kauri trees were planted in Willowbank Park in Wellington, New Zealand, Peter Jackson's home town. The number eleven represented the nine members of the Fellowship of the Ring, plus one each for Peter Jackson and J. R. R. Tolkien. Coincidentally, eleven was the number of 2004 Oscars won by The Lord of the Rings: The Return of the King. Hundreds of TORn members contributed funds for the purchase of the trees as a tangible and lasting way to give thanks to Jackson and his team for their inspiring work. TheOneRing.net teamed up with Creation Entertainment to present The One Ring Celebration (ORC) in 2005, 2006, and 2007. Its sister convention, Eastern LOTR Fan Gathering (ELF), met in the eastern U.S. in 2005 and 2006. These conventions included panels and signings by members of the cast such as Elijah Wood, Sean Astin, Dominic Monaghan, Billy Boyd, and John Rhys-Davies. In November 2008 and December 2011, TheOneRing.net and Red Carpet Tours staged a cruise for 14 nights from Auckland, New Zealand to Sydney (the 2011 cruise was Sydney to Auckland), including several short excursions to visit locations used in the filming of The Lord of the Rings.

Other sites 

TheOneRing.com (TORc), "The Home of Tolkien Online" is a Tolkien fan site that positions itself as catering more to the fans of Tolkien's literary works rather than Jackson's films. It was founded by Jonathan Watson, Ted Tschopp and David Mullich in April 1999. As of 2022, Watson has continued to run the website.

The Encyclopedia of Arda provides a detailed online reference to Middle-earth, mirrored at GlyphWeb.

A fan edit of the theatrical cut of The Lord of the Rings: The Two Towers exists, called The Two Towers: The Purist Edit. Most of the changes in 2007 were incorporated into The Lord of the Rings – The Purist Edition, a fan edit which turns the entire trilogy into an eight-hour film without most of the changes.

Tolkienology

Tolkienology is a term used by fans to describe the study of the works of J. R. R. Tolkien treating Middle-earth as a real ancient history, conducting research from an "in-universe" perspective. This differs from Tolkien studies in that it ignores the real-world history of composition by the author, and necessarily needs to assume an underlying internally consistent canon.

"Tolkienology" may include:

Tolkienian linguistics: Study of the most complete languages Tolkien designed for Middle-earth, (usually Quenya and Sindarin), study of the writing systems, the most known being the Tengwar, and possible reconstruction for everyday use, including by the Elvish Linguistic Fellowship.
debate on the "true" nature of Tom Bombadil, of balrogs etc. and debate on the "real" motivations of characters in the stories
Genealogies of Hobbit families and kings
The accuracy of Tolkien's calendars and how can they be used today
Reconstruction of history (of Elven kingdoms, Arnor and Gondor, Rohan or the more unknown lands)
Morality issues such as whether an omnipotent, omniscient and omnibenevolent Ilúvatar (God) would destroy Númenor, if the 'bad' Dunlendings had any right rivalling the 'good' Rohirrim and if Gondor committed genocides.
Possible census of population about each race.
Astronomic descriptions in the books (moon phases, positions of stars), and what can be inferred about Middle-earth geography from them.
Strategies of wars and battles, if they were right and what alternatives might have been
Possible folkloric impressions Hobbits had about places of the Shire and other whereabouts, determined by translating placenames.

Tolkiennymy

Tolkiennymy is a term coined by Tolkien scholar Mark T. Hooker to describe the study of Tolkien's use of names from existing languages. This branch of study examines the etymologies (origins) of names such as Bilbo, Boffin, The Yale, and Tom Bombadil.

Fandom and Tolkienian linguistics

The studies of Tolkien's artistic languages (notably Quenya and Sindarin) is a field where fandom and scholarly Tolkien studies overlap. The resulting friction between scholarly students of the languages focussing on their conceptual evolution and fandom-oriented students taking an "in-universe" view became visible notably in the "Elfconners" controversy of the late 1990s, involving among others the linguists David Salo and Carl F. Hostetter, the editor of Vinyar Tengwar. There is a "reconstructionist" camp, which pursues the reconstruction of unattested Elvish forms, and a "philological" or "purist" camp which focusses entirely on the conscientious edition of such fragments as can be found in Tolkien's unpublished papers. By its nature, reconstructionism aims for a "canon" of "correct" standard Elvish (Neo-Eldarin), while the philological study of the evolution of Tolkien's conceptions cannot assume that the languages had ever reached a complete or internally consistent final form. The "reconstructionist" camp is represented by Salo, who translated the poems in the libretto by Fran Walsh and Philippa Boyens for the Music of The Lord of the Rings film series, creating additional words in languages including Sindarin where necessary, while the "purist" camp is represented by Hostetter.

By region

Dedicated Tolkien Societies provide platforms for a combination of fandom and academic literary study in several countries. The most notable societies in the English-speaking world are The Tolkien Society (UK) and the Mythopoeic Society (USA).

United Kingdom

The Tolkien Society was formed in 1969 as an educational charity in the UK, but has a worldwide membership. The society publishes a regular bulletin called Amon Hen, with articles, artwork and occasional fiction. The society has three regular UK gatherings: an Annual General Meeting and Dinner; a Seminar with a mix of serious and lighthearted talks; and the Oxonmoot, a regular September gathering organized by the British Tolkien Society.

Mallorn is an annual journal produced by and for members of The Tolkien Society. It consists of long articles studying aspects of Tolkien's work, plus some artwork. The name is a reference to the Mallorn tree and an illustration of such a tree appears on the front of each issue. In the past it was issued every autumn, but since 2003 has been released in mid-summer.

German-speaking Europe

The German translation of The Hobbit appeared in 1957 (translated by Walter Scherf), and that of The Lord of the Rings in 1972 (translated by Margaret Carroux and Ebba-Margareta von Freymann).

The Deutsche Tolkien Gesellschaft (DTG) is a German association dedicated to the study of the life and works of J. R. R. Tolkien. Founded in 1997, it is based in Cologne.
The DTG has more than 500 members (as of 2005) and is organized in a widespread network of local chapters. It is the main driving force of Tolkien reception in the German speaking countries (c.f. Honegger (2006); the first Swiss Tolkien Society (Eredain) was founded in 1986 and published the Aglared journal; it dissolved in 2006 and a second Swiss Tolkien Society (Seryn Ennor) was founded in 2014 and is based in Jenins; an Austrian Tolkien Society was founded in 2002). The DTG organized a seminar on Tolkien studies in Cologne in 2004, in Jena in 2005 and in Mainz in 2006. The conference proceedings are published in their Hither Shore yearbook.

Hungary

The Magyar Tolkien Társaság (Hungarian Tolkien Society) is a registered public benefit organization whose aim is to enhance public knowledge on the works and mythology created by J. R. R. Tolkien. Apart from organizing the Hungarian Tolkien aficionados into a community (choir, charity ball, creative workshops), the association has grown multifaceted since its foundation in 2002, it provides professional and technical editorial support for new publications, publishes the semiannual magazine Lassi Laurië featuring scholarly articles, interviews, and literary works, and it organizes numerous conferences, meetings and summer camps. In 2002, for its tenth anniversary, the society organized a joint conference with the Institute of English Studies of Károli Gáspár University of the Reformed Church in Hungary entitled "J. R. R. Tolkien: Fantasy and Ethics" and published a book of studies containing the papers presented. The Magyar Tolkien Társaság maintains relations with other tertiary institutions such as the Department of History and Philosophy of Science of Eötvös Loránd University, together with whom it regularly launches courses on Tolkienian subjects ("J. R. R. Tolkien – A 20th Century Mythology")

Slovakia

The main Slovak organization for fans of Tolkien's fiction is the non-profit civic association Spoločenstvo Tolkiena (The Fellowship of Tolkien), founded in 2002. Its main goal is to unite fans of Tolkien's works and discuss them, as well as discuss other related fantasy fiction by non-Tolkien authors. In the past, the association published its own irregular fanzine, dubbed Athelas. Other activities of the association include reenactment and live-action roleplaying, and between 2006 and 2019, serving as the co-founder and co-organiser of the annual Slovak fantasy fiction festival SlavCon (now run by its own dedicated association).

Nordic countries

Sweden

The Tolkien Society of Sweden was the first J. R. R. Tolkien society in Europe. It was started in Gothenburg, Sweden, in 1968 by members of Club Cosmos. They published the members' magazine Långbottenbladet. Originally it was just called "The Tolkien Society" but when the British society of the same name was created the members added "of Sweden" to its name.

The Tolkien Society Forodrim (Sindarin for "People of the North") was founded in Sweden in 1972 and is one of the oldest Tolkien fan organizations. The Forodrim was founded in a public toilet during a science fiction convention (possibly SF-Kongressen 1973) as a name change of Sam J Lundwall's Hyboria. Co-founders were Jörgen Peterzén and Anders Palm.

Denmark

In Denmark, Tolkien became well known in the 1970s and has considerably influenced Danish language fantasy literature since. In 1977, Queen Margrethe II of Denmark illustrated The Lord of the Rings. There are two Danish Tolkien societies; Bri, the Danish Tolkien Society, and the online Imladris community.

Norway

The Hobbit appeared in Norwegian translation in 1972 and The Lord of the Rings followed from 1973 to 1975 (Tiden Norsk Forlag). Both translations were harshly criticized for errors and inconsistencies and complaints resulted in a new translation of The Lord of the Rings, published in 1980/81. By the late 1980s, Tolkien's works were well known to the Norwegian public. A translation of the Silmarillion appeared in 1994. The unsatisfactory Hobbit translation was replaced only in 1997. By the mid-1990s, the popularity of Tolkien had risen to a level that made viable translations of his minor works. 

Arthedain – The Tolkien Society of Norway was founded in Oslo in 1981.

Finland

The Finnish Tolkien Society Kontu (Suomen Tolkien-seura Kontu ry in Finnish) is a registered society based in Helsinki, Finland. The society was originally two different societies that unified at the beginning of 2012. The Finnish Tolkien Society (Suomen Tolkien seura) was founded on 3 January 1992 and Kontu Internet Community (Verkkoyhteisö Kontu ry) was founded on 19 December 2006. The main focus of the society is to improve knowledge of J. R. R. Tolkien and his works in Finland as well as to maintain the virtual community and thus the website the society originated from. The various parts of the website contain a discussion forum, a wiki and an IRC channel. KontuWiki has been credited in several Finnish Tolkien related publications since 2007. Every year the society awards the Kuvastaja-prize for the year's best Finnish Fantasy book. There is much smial-activity and the society organizes meetings and other events for Tolkien fans from all over the country.

Russia

Interest in Russia awoke soon after the publication of The Lord of the Rings in 1955, long before the first Russian translation.
A first effort at publication was made in the 1960s, but to comply with literary censorship in Soviet Russia, the work was considerably abridged and transformed. The ideological danger of the book was seen in the "hidden allegory 'of the conflict between the individualist West and the totalitarian, Communist East.'", while, ironically, Marxist readings in the west conversely identified Tolkien's anti-industrial ideas as presented in the Shire with primitive communism, in a struggle with the evil forces of technocratic capitalism. Russian translations of The Lord of the Rings were published only after the collapse of the Soviet Union, but then in great numbers, no less than ten official Russian translations appeared between 1990 and 2005. Tolkien fandom in Russia grew especially rapidly during the early 1990s at Moscow State University. Many unofficial and partly fragmentary translations are in circulation. The first translation appearing in print was that by Kistyakovskij and Muravyov (volume 1, published 1982).

Notable derivative works by Russian writers, which often takes the form of alternative accounts or informal sequels to Tolkien's published works, include The Last Ringbearer (Последний кольценосец) by Kirill Eskov, and The Black Book of Arda ("Чёрная Книга Арды"). One of the authors of The Black Book of Arda derived her pen name from Nienna, the Vala Lady of Mercy: according to Mark T. Hooker, the work proved so influential in Russia following its 1992 release that "Niennism" emerged as a term used to describe both a "distinctive literary turn and intellectual following". In contrast, Olga Chigirinskaya's Beyond the Dawn ("По ту сторону рассвета") preserves the original Tolkien's Catholic point of view and considers The Black Book of Arda as an example of Melcorian propaganda.

Japan

The Hobbit appeared in a Japanese translation in 1965 (Hobitto no Boken) and The Lord of the Rings from 1972 to 1975 (Yubiwa Monogatari), both translated by Teiji Seta (1916–1979), in 1992 revised by Seta's assistant Akiko Tanaka. In 1982, Tanaka translated the Silmarillion (Sirumariru no Monogatari).
Teiji Seta was an expert in classical Japanese literature and a haiku poet, and the Tolkien scholar Roberto Arduini regards the Seta and Tanaka translations as "almost perfect".

Greece

The Hobbit and Lord of the Rings were published in Greek by Kedros during the 1970s, each by different translators. In the mid-90s Aiolos published Silmarillion and Unfinished Tales. In 2001, shortly before the release of the movies, the first Greek on-line community was formed in a promotional web site which in 2002 founded an official group of fans under the name The Prancing Pony. The group is unofficially divided in two 'smials', in Athens and Thessaloniki.

Bulgaria

The Bulgarian Tolkien Society was officially established in 1998 when the Bulgarian Tolkien Fan Club Rin Ennor was first registered as a non-profit non-governmental organization by a few students from the Sofia University. Apart from the larger communities in the big cities, the Bulgarian Tolkien Society has local clubs and groups.

Turkey

Interest in Turkey awoke to The Lord of the Rings in the late 1980s, long before the first Turkish translation. A translation of The Lord of the Rings into Turkish was published as Yüzüklerin Efendisi in 1997. After the release of the movies, other Tolkien-related books such as The Silmarillion were translated into Turkish.

Pakistan

Interest in Prof Tolkien's work developed in Pakistan soon after its earliest inception as a separate nation and has existed sporadically over the years. Interest grew manifold after the release and completion of the Lord of the Rings film trilogy and in 2003–04, the 'Lahore Tolkien Reading Group' was established there.

Italy 

The Italian Tolkien Society (Società Tolkeniana Italiana) was founded in February 1994, after a series of lectures about Tolkien's thought and works made in Italy in 1992 by the Tolkien Society archivist, Patricia Reynolds, on the centenary of Tolkien's birth. She stimulated the creation of the new Society, of which she became a godmother. Priscilla Tolkien also became an honorary partner. During the years the Society managed to grow enough to have hundreds of members and a lot of constant activities.
It publishes two six-monthly magazines (Terra di Mezzo and Minas Tirith) and organizes two competitions for narrative and images (The Silmaril Awards), from which various publications (such as the volume Frammenti della Terra di Mezzo, a collection of the best stories) are derived. In collaboration with Italian national publishers it also publishes illustrated calendars whose beauty been recognized not only in Italy but internationally as well, for example by HarperCollins (Tolkien's publishing house) that drawn some images from them for their book "Realms of Tolkien".
Every year, in September, usually on its first weekend, they organize the Hobbiton, a great three-days feast with conferences, meetings, debates, concerts, dances, costume re-enactments, film screenings, treasure hunts and other Middle-Earth realated activities. They also founded the Palantír publishing house.

In 2021, a pastry chef, Nicolas Gentile, bought a piece of land at Bucchianico in Abruzzo, and walked with friends in costume as the members of the Fellowship of the Ring to throw a ring into the crater of Mount Vesuvius. He has built a hobbit-style house and is seeking crowdfunding to build more. In his view, the people of the region "have always lived as hobbits" close to nature.

See also 

 Tolkienmoot – a gaming convention
 Tolkien tourist – tourism related to Tolkien's books or Jackson's films
 Fantasy fandom – fan activity related to fantasy more generally

References

Sources

 
 Broadway, Cliff; Cordova, Carlene. Ringers: Lord of the Fans (2005 documentary)
 
  
 
 Kohman, Catherine. Lembas for the Soul: How the Lord of the Rings Enriches Everyday Life (2005), .

External links
History
Interview with Richard Plotz, New York Times, 1967
Ed Mesky's Reminiscences of the early days of Tolkien fandom
University of Wisconsin Tolkien and Fantasy Society website with bibliography of Orcrist
Tolkien societies
Tolkien Brasil – Brazil
Elanor – Flanders, Belgium
Bri – Denmark
Deutsche Tolkien Gesellschaft – Germany
Società Tolkeniana Italiana – Italy
Unquendor – Netherlands
Arthedain – Norway
Forodrim – Stockholm, Sweden
Mithlond – Goteborg, Sweden
Seryn Ennor – Switzerland
The Tolkien Society – United Kingdom
The Mythopoeic Society site – United States
Esteldore – Colombia
Magyar Tolkien Társaság – Hungary
Spoločenstvo Tolkiena – Slovakia
Orta Dünya – Turkey
Meneltarma – Romania